The Canadian Pro Rodeo Hall of Fame (CPRHF) was founded in 1979 to honour and distinguish outstanding contestants, builders, and animals in the Canadian rodeo arena. Inductees are qualified by the Canadian Rodeo Historical Association.

The CPRHF, located at the Calnash Ag Events Centre in Ponoka, Alberta, displays artifacts of the history of professional rodeo in Canada. There are currently 203 inductees in the Canadian Pro Rodeo Hall of Fame since the 2019 inductees added eight new members.

List of Canadian Pro Rodeo Hall of Fame Inductees 
 The Canadian Pro Rodeo Hall of Fame inductees are tracked in a separate article.

References

External links
 Official Site

Cowboy halls of fame
Halls of fame in Canada
Museums established in 1979
Ponoka, Alberta
1979 establishments in Alberta
Rodeo in Canada
Canadian Pro Rodeo Hall of Fame inductees